David Adam Clift (born 3 January 1962) is a male retired British rower.

Rowing career
Clift competed at the 1984 Summer Olympics and the 1988 Summer Olympics. He represented England and won a gold medal in the coxed four, at the 1986 Commonwealth Games in Edinburgh, Scotland.

He won the double sculls with Steve Redgrave, rowing for the Marlow Rowing Club, at the 1980 National Rowing Championships.

Personal life
His brother is Olympian Jonathan Clift.

References

External links
 
 

1962 births
Living people
British male rowers
Olympic rowers of Great Britain
Rowers at the 1984 Summer Olympics
Rowers at the 1988 Summer Olympics
Commonwealth Games medallists in rowing
Commonwealth Games gold medallists for England
Rowers at the 1986 Commonwealth Games
Medallists at the 1986 Commonwealth Games